Lake Misurina  (Cadorino dialect: Lago de Meśorìna) is the largest natural lake of the Cadore and it is 1,754 m above sea level, near Auronzo di Cadore (Belluno). The lake's perimeter is 2.6 km long, while the maximum depth is 5 m.

Near the lake there are about ten hotels with accommodation for around 500 people.

The particular climatic characteristics of the area around the lake make particularly good air for those who have respiratory diseases.  Near the lake is the only center in Italy for the care of childhood asthma.

The lake was the theme of a famous song by Claudio Baglioni.  Lake Misurina is also the theme of the theatrical representation of the Longane di Lozzo.

Lake Misurina is where the speed skating events were held during the 1956 Winter Olympics of Cortina d'Ampezzo – the last time Olympic speed skating events were held on natural ice.

Misurina lies on the route of the Dolomites Gold Cup Race.

Folklore

There are at least two different legends associated with Lake Misurina. In the first one, which was also made famous by a song named "Sabato pomeriggio" by Claudio Baglioni, Misurina is a little capricious and spiteful girl who lives literally held in the palm of the hand of her gigantic father, the king Sorapiss that, to fulfill another desire and obtain for her the magic mirror from the Queen of Monte Cristallo, he is transformed into a mountain. During the last stages of the transformation he sees his daughter fall and his tears flow like rivers and form the lake beneath which his daughter will forever live with the magic mirror.

In the second one, Mesurina (who is later nicknamed) is a daughter of wealthy merchants from Venice who send her away in the mountains by her father anxious not to fulfill a prophecy that would see the girl give away all their possessions. Following some tragic amorous events vaguely reminiscent of Romeo and Juliet, the girl dies, and she is recognized on the point of death by a lover whom she met in bloom and from whom she was brought away by deception from the stables of his father and a servant sent by him.

Gallery

See also 
 List of lakes in Italy#Alphabetical

References

External links
 
 Misurina web site
 1956 Winter Olympics official report  (pp. 180–88)

Misurina
Olympic speed skating venues
Province of Belluno
Speed skating venues in Italy
Venues of the 1956 Winter Olympics